"Only Love" is a song by American singer Mary J. Blige. It was written by Blige, Charles Hinshaw, David "Lucky Daye" Brown, Warren Felder and Andrew Wansel, and produced by Felder and Wansel under the production moniker Pop & Oak.  The song is built around a sample of "Doctor Love" (1977) by American girl group First Choice. Due to the inclusion of the sample, Allan Felder, Norman Harris, and Ron Tyson are also credited as songwriters.  The song was released as a single on July 12, 2018 and peaked at number five on the US Adult R&B Songs.

Chart performance
"Only Love" entered the top ten on the US Billboard Adult R&B Songs in the week ending September 2, 2018, becoming Blige's 23rd top ten hit on the chart. This made her the artist with the most top ten entries on the Adult R&B Songs, breaking a tie Gerald Levert to claim first place. "Only Love" eventually peaked at number five.

Track listing

Credits and personnel 
Credits adapted from the liner notes of "Only Love."

Mary J. Blige – writer
David "Lucky Daye" Brown – writer
Marshall Bryant – recording assistant 
Allan Felder – writer (sample)
Warren Felder – producer, writer
Norman Harris – writer (sample)
Charles Hinshaw – writer

Jaycen Joshua – mixing
Rashawn McLean – mixing assistant 
Jon Nettlesbey – recording assistant 
Jacob Richardsn – mixing assistant 
Mike Seabergn – mixing assistant 
Ron Tyson – writer (sample)
Andrew Wansel – producer, writer

Charts

Release history

References

2018 singles
2018 songs
Mary J. Blige songs